Huayuankou is a town under the administration of Jingyu County, Jilin, China. , it has one residential community and 19 villages under its administration.

References 

Township-level divisions of Jilin
Jingyu County